Glaucocharis molleri is a moth in the family Crambidae. It was described by David E. Gaskin in 1988. It is found in Sikkim, India.

References

Diptychophorini
Moths described in 1988